Lawrence Hertzog (June 25, 1951 – April 19, 2008) was an American television writer and producer. He is best known for creating the cult series Nowhere Man, which aired for one season during 1995–1996 on UPN.

Hertzog was born in Flushing, Queens and grew up in Teaneck, New Jersey.

In addition to continuing work in the entertainment industry, Hertzog also hosted a podcast entitled Drinks with Larry and Lauren in Los Angeles, featuring himself and his former assistant Lauren Proctor.

Hertzog lived in Studio City, California. He died of cancer at Cedars Sinai Hospital in Los Angeles on April 19, 2008.

Trivia
 Hertzog's friend and Nowhere Man producer Joel Surnow named an off-screen CIA official on his series 24 "Larry Hertzog".

External links
 
 Hertzog's Blog
 Drinks with Larry and Lauren podcast
 MIPtalk.com episode honoring Larry Hertzog on 1st anniversary of his death
 MIPtalk.com features final unaired episode of Drinks With Larry and Lauren podcast
 Nowhere Man creator Lawrence Hertzog dead at 56

1951 births
2008 deaths
American television writers
American male television writers
Television producers from California
People from Teaneck, New Jersey
People from Queens, New York
People from Studio City, Los Angeles
Screenwriters from New York (state)
Screenwriters from New Jersey
Television producers from New York City
Screenwriters from California
20th-century American screenwriters
20th-century American male writers
Television producers from New Jersey